Tech trance, is a subgenre within electronic music that draws upon the techno and trance genres as the name suggests.

History
Tech trance was pioneered by Oliver Lieb among others in the late 1990s. Other early examples of tech-trance producers are Humate, Chris Cowie and Marmion. Tech trance evolved in a new direction during the early 2000s, some DJs pioneering this in San Francisco were Keith Edwards, Skyscraper, Owen Vallis and DJ Amber. By 2006, the most widespread variant of trance was the still growing and evolving genre of tech trance, pioneered by the likes of producers such as Dave Schiemann, Simon Patterson, Bryan Kearney, Will Atkinson, Matt Bowdidge, John Askew, Ian Booth, Sam Jones, Will Rees, Indecent Noise, Marco V, Tempo Giusto and Mark Sherry.

Style
Defining features of tech trance are complex, electronic rhythms, heavily quantised and usually driven by a loud kick drum, with filtered, dirty or slightly distorted hi-hat sounds and claps; harder synth sounds, usually with a large amount of resonance or delay; minimal pads, often with sidechaining to increase the volume of the beat. While earlier variants of trance often featured piano, strings or acoustic guitar, tech trance almost exclusively features synthesized sound, though electric guitar sounds occasionally feature.

Notes

Techno genres
Trance genres